Donald J. DeFronzo is an American politician. He was a Democratic state senator from Connecticut from 2003 until 2011 when he was appointed Department of Administrative Services commissioner by Governor Dan Malloy.

A resident of New Britain, DeFronzo represented Berlin, Farmington, and New Britain in the Connecticut Senate. Prior to being elected to the Senate, he served as mayor of New Britain from 1989 to 1993.

He holds degrees from Fairfield University and the University of Connecticut. He currently serves as Governor William A. O'Neill Endowed Chair in Public Policy and Practical Politics at Central Connecticut State University.

On August 24, 2017, Governor Dan Malloy named DeFronzo chair of the CT Lottery Corporation.

See also
Connecticut Senate

References

External links
Official website

Democratic Party Connecticut state senators
Fairfield University alumni
University of Connecticut alumni
Living people
1948 births
Politicians from New Britain, Connecticut